Datuk Doraisingam Pillai is the CEO of the Lotus chain of restaurants and companies, which include music shops and cineplexes. He was awarded the Malaysian Indian Entrepreneur of 2005 by Malaysian Associated Indian Chambers of Commerce & Industry's (MAICCI).

References

Malaysian people of Indian descent
Tamil businesspeople
Businesspeople of Indian descent
Malaysian businesspeople
Living people
Year of birth missing (living people)